Live (stylized as LiVe) is the third live album by Jonas Brothers and their last release before their hiatus. It was released on November 26, 2013, in the US exclusively on their website. The album was stylized with an uppercase "V" for the number five in the Roman numeral, a reference to the original cancelled fifth studio album that was due for release in late 2013. It was recorded between July 23 and August 16, 2013, at Mohegan Sun Arena and Gibson Amphitheatre during the final tour.

Background
In August 2012, the Jonas Brothers announced a reunion to release a fifth album. On October 3, 2012, a preview of the song "Meet You In Paris" was released on Cambio. On October 11, 2012, at Radio City Music Hall in New York City, where they performed several songs from their previous albums along with a new song entitled "Let's Go", intended to be on their fifth studio album. During the reunion concert, they also performed a new song entitled "Wedding Bells". Another new song, entitled "First Time" was also debuted during the reunion concert. On October 29, 2012, it was announced that the Jonas Brothers would hold two concerts at the Pantages Theatre in Los Angeles. A third date was announced on November 2, 2012. The concerts took place on November 27, 28, and 29, 2012, respectively. They performed at Jingle Ball at L.A. Live on December 1, 2012, and announced several tour dates to take place in South America in February and March 2013 as part of their 2012/2013 World Tour, their first concert tour since the 2010 World Tour. They performed at the Viña del Mar International Song Festival on February 28, 2013, in Chile.

Development

Their fifth studio album, which would have been their first not to be released through Hollywood Records since 2006 and their first record since 2009's Lines, Vines and Trying Times, was scheduled to be released in 2013. The lead single, "Pom Poms" was released on April 2, 2013. The music video for the song was filmed in February 2013 in New Orleans, Louisiana and premiered on E! on April 2, 2013. "First Time", the second single from their fifth album, was released on June 25, 2013. On July 10, 2013, the group announced that their fifth studio album would be titled V (pronounced: Five), the Roman numeral for five.

On October 9, 2013, the group cancelled their highly anticipated comeback tour days before it was slated to start, citing a "deep rift within the band" over "creative differences". Following the tour cancellation, the Jonas Brothers' Twitter page went offline and the brothers' individual accounts became temporarily obsolete; causing several media outlets to report that a break-up was imminent. On October 29, 2013, the Jonas Brothers officially confirmed their split and announced that the release of V had been cancelled. During an interview, Nick Jonas stated that the album wouldn't be released but decided to release 16 recordings to their Team Jonas fan club members. "We want to do something special for our fans because they've been so supportive of us for so many years. What we've decided to do is package an album with 10 live tracks from the summer tour and four of the songs that would have been on 'V', and if you count 'Pom Poms' and 'First Time', it's actually 6 songs that would have been on 'V'. We’ll be sending that out soon for the fans." The album was released with the title "Live", noting the letter "V" in caps, a reference to the original project, the cancelled fifth studio album.

After the band returned in 2019, the Jonas Brothers released the original project "V" in full as an LP through their merchandise website, which contains ten tracks, four of which were previously unreleased.

Track listing
LiVe (2013 digital release)

V (2019 vinyl release)

Personnel
Credits for LiVe: 
Nick Jonas – lead vocals , production , guitars , keyboards , drums , piano , bass , all programmed instrumentation [drums, bass, keys] 
 Joe Jonas – lead vocals , background vocals 
 Kevin Jonas II – guitars , lead vocals , background vocals 
 John Taylor – guitar and background vocals 
 Ryan Liestman – keyboards and backing vocals 
 Jack Lawless – drums 
 Greg Garbowsky – bass and backing vocals 
 Paris Carney-Garbowsky – backing vocals 
 Megan Mullins – violin  and backing vocals

Release history

References

Jonas Brothers albums
2013 live albums
2013 video albums
Hollywood Records live albums
Hollywood Records video albums
Live video albums